Cajacay District is one of fifteen districts of the Bolognesi Province in Peru.

Geography 
Other mountains are listed below:

References

Districts of the Bolognesi Province
Districts of the Ancash Region